German submarine U-486 was a Type VIIC U-boat built for Nazi Germany's Kriegsmarine for service during World War II. She was laid down at the Deutsche Werke in Kiel as yard number 321, launched on 12 February 1944 and commissioned on 22 March with Oberleutnant zur See Gerhard Meyer in command.

The boat began training on 22 March with the 5th U-boat Flotilla but moved on to the 11th flotilla for operations.

She was one of nine Type VIIs that the Kriegsmarine fitted with an experimental synthetic rubber skin of anechoic tiles known as Alberich, which had been designed to counter the Allies' asdic/sonar devices.

Design 
German Type VIIC submarines were preceded by the shorter Type VIIB submarines. U-486 had a displacement of  when at the surface and  while submerged. She had two shafts and two  propellers.

U-486 was fitted with five  torpedo tubes (four fitted at the bow and one at the stern), fourteen torpedoes, one  SK C/35 naval gun, (220 rounds), one  Flak M42 and two twin  C/30 anti-aircraft guns. The boat had a complement of between forty-four and sixty.

Service history 
The submarine moved to Horten Naval Base in Norway between 6 and 9 November 1944 and then Egersund, (also in Norway, on the southwest coast, between Stavanger and Kristiansand), arriving there on 20 November.

First patrol 
She departed Egersund on her first patrol on 26 November 1944, taking a circuitous route around the British Isles to the Western Approaches. The U-boat claimed her first victim south of the Eddystone Lighthouse by sinking the Silverlaurel on 18 December. This resulted in the death of over 750 Allied soldiers (819 total deaths). The Leopoldville sank about two hours later. She crippled the US-built but British manned frigate  on the 26th. She also sank , another frigate, on the same day.

She was unsuccessfully attacked by a Canadian Vickers Wellington of 407 Squadron, RCAF on 30 December.

She returned to Norway, this time to Bergen, on 15 January 1945.

Second patrol 
The boat departed Bergen on 9 April 1945, but was sunk by torpedoes from the British submarine  on 12 April.

Summary of raiding history

Discovery of wreck 
The wreck of U-486 is located c.  from that of the fellow German submarine .

See also 

 German submarine U-480

References

Notes

Citations

Bibliography

External links 

 

German Type VIIC submarines
World War II submarines of Germany
1944 ships
Ships built in Kiel
U-boats commissioned in 1944
U-boats sunk in 1945
U-boats sunk by British submarines
World War II shipwrecks in the North Sea
Ships lost with all hands
Maritime incidents in April 1945